O'Connells Caherciveen were a Gaelic Athletic Association football club from the town of Caherciveen in South County Kerry, Ireland. They won the South Kerry Senior Football Championship 6 times in all.

Honours
 South Kerry Senior Football Championship (6) 1902, 1903, 1904, 1928, 1929, 1931

References

Former Gaelic Athletic Association clubs in Kerry
Gaelic games clubs in County Kerry
Gaelic football clubs in County Kerry